14th Armored may refer to:

 14th Armored Division (United States)
 14th Armored Cavalry Regiment (United States)